The Mask of Sheba is a 1970 American made-for-television adventure film starring Walter Pidgeon, Inger Stevens, Eric Braeden, William Marshall and Stephen Young. It is directed by David Lowell Rich and was first broadcast on NBC on March 9, 1970.

Plot
An anthropological team travels to a dense African jungle in search of missing safari members and a priceless gold statue. The journey is endangered by primitive tribesmen, treacherous territory and intrigue within the group.

Cast
 Walter Pidgeon as Dr. Condon
 Inger Stevens as Sarah
 Eric Braeden as Dr. Morgan
 William Marshall as Condor
 Stephen Young as Travis
 Corinne Camacho as Joanna
 Joseph Wiseman as Bondelok
 Christopher Cary as Peter

References

External links 
 

1970 television films
1970 films
1970s adventure films
Adventure television films
American adventure films
Films set in Ethiopia
Treasure hunt films
NBC network original films
Films directed by David Lowell Rich
Films scored by Lalo Schifrin
1970s American films